India has many regional film centres, such as Bollywood (Hindi) in Mumbai, Telugu cinema (Tollywood) in Hyderabad, Marathi cinema in Pune, Tamil cinema in Chennai, Malayalam cinema in Kochi, Kannada cinema in Bangalore, Odia Cinema in Bhubaneswar, Assamese cinema in Guwahati, Punjabi cinema in Mohali and Bengali cinema in Kolkata  . Most Indian film directors are known for their work with one regional industry, while many others are active directors of films from multiple industries.

Directors of parallel or independent cinema
Parallel Cinema is otherwise known as "Art films" cinema, and is known for its serious and realistic films with real-life situations. In the 1960s and 1970s, the Indian government financed a number of such films, on Indian themes. Many of the directors were graduates of the Film and Television Institute of India, Pune. Ritwik Ghatak was a professor at the institute and a well-known director in his own right. The best-known Indian "neo-realist" is Satyajit Ray.

Active in multiple languages
The following is a list of film directors who have directed films from more than one regional film industry in India. This does not include directors who work in a single industry whose films have been dubbed into other languages.

Bengali film directors

Punjabi film directors

Gujrati film directors

Kannada film directors

Malayalam film directors

Marathi film directors

Tamil film directors

Telugu film directors

Jammu and Kashmir film directors

References

 Arvind Gupta Filmmaker Director&founder of purple flicks @purpleflicks.official, Traveler/Creator/Thinker/scuba diver, www.purpleflicks.com

Film directors